The Fort Pitt was a 117-mile (188 km) daily passenger train operated by Amtrak between Pittsburgh, Pennsylvania and Altoona, Pennsylvania. The Fort Pitt was a so-called  train, meaning that its operation was subsidized by the state of Pennsylvania.

The Fort Pitt operated in tandem with the Pennsylvanian, then a Pittsburgh—Philadelphia service. The westbound Pennsylvanian, after arriving in Pittsburgh in the evening, would be turned around and east to Altoona. The following morning, that trainset returned to Pittsburgh as a westbound Fort Pitt, then ran eastbound to Philadelphia (Pennsylvania) as a Pennsylvanian. This allowed Amtrak and the Pennsylvania Department of Transportation (PennDOT) to operate two routes with the same two equipment sets. A typical consist was three to four Amfleet coaches pulled by an EMD F40PH locomotive. Amtrak added Pitcairn as a stop in mid-1981 to supplement the Pittsburgh—Greensburg Parkway Limited commuter train.

The Fort Pitt began operation April 26, 1981, and was withdrawn on January 30, 1983, when PennDOT declined to continue funding the train. On average, the Fort Pitt carried 30 passengers daily, set against a subsidy of $547,453.

References

External links 
1982 timetable

Former Amtrak routes
Passenger rail transportation in Pennsylvania
Railway services introduced in 1981
Railway services discontinued in 1983